Pablo Montoya (also known as Jose Pablo Montoya) (July 1, 1792– February 7, 1847) was a New Mexican politician who was active both in the 1837 revolt against the Mexican government, and in the Taos Revolt of 1847 against the United States, during the Mexican–American War.

Early life and education
Jose Pablo Montoya was born July 1, 1792, the son of Andres Montoya and Victoria Velarde.

Career
At some point Montoya was the mayor of Taos. In 1837 he was part of the New Mexican Río Arriba Rebellion which briedly put José María González and Montoya as governor of New Mexico. Both González and Montoya were both Taos Pueblo Indians and led the Junta Popular, the most ethnically inclusive government in the history of New Mexico. Montoya replaced González as Governor. In September of that year he led an army of 3000 rebels to within a league and a half of Santa Fe, where he arranged a truce with Gen. Manuel Armijo. He secured his personal immunity by turning over the planners of the rebellion, who were jailed in Santa Fe and later executed by Armijo's forces. Montoya was allowed to return to his home.

In January 1847 Montoya participated in the insurrection against United States rule in New Mexico, begun by those who did not accept the Mexican governor's surrender. Historian David Lavender said that Montoya "style[d] himself as the Santa Anna of the North."

Montoya was captured during the 1847 revolt. After the U.S. had re-established control, a U.S. military court charged him with and convicted him of treason. The judges sentenced him and 14 other men to death for their roles in the revolt. Montoya and the others were hanged in the Taos Plaza on February 7, 1847.

Personal life
He married Maria Teresa Esquivel and they had established a family in present-day Taos, New Mexico. He was likely a landowner and rancher.

Cultural references
 Pablo Montoya is featured as one of the protagonists in Maxwell Anderson's 1932 play Night Over Taos.

References

1816 births
1847 deaths
19th-century executions of American people
People executed by the United States military by hanging
People of the Taos Revolt
Mexican people of the Mexican–American War